A writ for the election of the 10th General Assembly of Nova Scotia was issued Aug. 17, 1811. It convened on February 6, 1812 and held eight sessions. It was dissolved on May 11, 1818.

The assembly sat at the pleasure of Lieutenant Governor John Coape Sherbrooke. George Ramsay became Lieutenant Governor in 1816.

Lewis Morris Wilkins was chosen as speaker for the house, seat declared vacant Feb. 13, 1817.  Simon Bradstreet Robie was chosen as speaker Feb. 13, 1817.

List of members

Amherst Township
Edward Baker
Annapolis County
Thomas Ritchie -took seat Feb. 7, 1812.
Peleg Wiswall -seat declared vacant Mar. 5, 1817, appointed associate judge of Supreme Court.
Cereno Upham Jones -by-election June 4, 1817, took seat Feb. 10, 1818.
Annapolis Township
John Harris
Barrington Township
John Sargent
Cornwallis Township
William Allen Chipman
Cumberland County
Thomas Roach -took seat Feb. 17, 1812.
Henry Purdy
Digby Township
John Warwick
Falmouth Township
John Manning
Granville Township
Isaiah Shaw -took seat Feb. 17, 1812.
Halifax County
Edward Mortimer -took seat Feb. 14, 1812.
Samuel George William Archibald -took seat Feb. 14, 1812.
Simon Bradstreet Robie
William Lawson
Halifax Township
John George Pyke
John Pryor
Hants County
William Hersey Otis Haliburton
Shubael Dimock
Horton Township
Samuel Bishop
Kings County
Jonathan Crane
John Wells -took seat Feb. 7, 1812.
Liverpool Township
Joseph Freeman
Londonderry Township
James Fleming
Lunenburg County
Lewis Morris Wilkins -seat declared vacant Feb. 13, 1817, appointed puisne judge of Supreme Court.
Edward James -by-election June 2, 1817, took seat Feb. 27, 1818.
Francis Joseph Rudolf -took seat Feb. 10, 1812.
Lunenburg Township
John Creighton, Jr. -took seat Feb. 10, 1812.
Newport Township
John Allison
Onslow Township
Nathaniel Marsters
Queens County
Snow Parker
George Collins -took seat Mar. 20, 1812, died May 6, 1813.
John Barss -by-election Aug. 25, 1813, took seat Feb. 17, 1814.
Shelburne County
Jacob Van Buskirk -took seat Mar. 14, 1814.
James Lent -took seat July 21, 1812
Shelburne Township
Colin Campbell -took seat Mar. 19, 1814.
Sydney County
John George Marshall -2nd writ for Sydney Co. issued Oct. 28, election Dec. 2, 1811, took seat Feb. 6, 1812.
James Ballaine -2nd writ for Sydney Co. issued Oct. 28, election Dec. 2, 1811, took seat Feb. 6, 1812, died April 10, 1812.
Samuel Hood George (1812) -by-election Aug. 13, 1812, may not have taken seat, died June 10, 1813.
John Cunningham -by-election May 20, 1814, took seat Feb. 8, 1815.
Truro Township
James Kent
Windsor Township
Loran DeWolf
Yarmouth Township
Samuel Marshall – took seat February 13, 1812; died April 1, 1813.
Samuel Sheldon Poole – by-election September 3, 1813; took seat February 11, 1814.

References
Journal and proceedings of the House of Assembly, 1812 (1812)

Terms of the General Assembly of Nova Scotia
1811 in Canada
1812 in Canada
1813 in Canada
1814 in Canada
1815 in Canada
1816 in Canada
1817 in Canada
1818 in Canada
1811 establishments in Nova Scotia
1818 disestablishments in Nova Scotia